Dashtiari or Dashtyari is the name of a region in south-eastern Iran. It may also refer specifically to:
 Dashtiari District
 Polan, Iran, a village in Polan District
 Dashtiari River